Evoplosoma claguei is a species of deep sea corallivores (preys on deep-sea corals). This species in particular is found in seamounts in the North Pacific.

References

Further reading
Mah, Christopher L. "A new Atlantic species of Evoplosoma with taxonomic summary and in situ observations of Atlantic deep-sea corallivorous Goniasteridae (Valvatida; Asteroidea)." Marine Biodiversity Records 8 (2015): e5.

External links 

WOMRS

Evoplosoma
Animals described in 2010